Martin Taylor may refer to:

Martin Andrew Taylor, president of Vista Consulting Group and former Microsoft employee
Sir Martin J. Taylor (born 1952), British mathematician and past Vice-President of the Royal Society
Martin Taylor (guitarist) (born 1956), British jazz guitarist
Martin Taylor (businessman) (born 1952), former Barclays chief executive
Martin Taylor (cricketer) (born 1957), English cricketer
Martin Taylor (footballer, born 1966), English football goalkeeper
Martin Taylor (footballer, born 1979), English football defender
Martin Taylor (investor) (born 1969), British investor and hedge fund manager
Marty Taylor, fictional character in Home Improvement